Vishal V. Sharma has been nominated as India's ambassador/permanent representative to UNESCO.

Sharma has previously worked as an officer on special duty for Narendra Modi in Gujarat, India.

In an article, Sharma compared Modi to a supercomputer who is "having to work on an outmoded motherboard that is the Indian bureaucracy." There have been attempts by a section of the media to vilify the appointment of Sharma through ill-written writeups and fictionalised story making based on Twitter research.

Sharma is a highly qualified and recognised personality with extensive overseas experience spanning over two decades. In 2003, he was sent by World Youth Council Against Terrorism (WYCAT) under the Chairmanship of G. Kishen Reddy, now Minister of State for Home Affairs for the 3rd International Conference on Counter-Terrorism in Herzilya Pituah (ISRAEL) organized by International Institute for Counter Terrorism (ICT). In a call for "Rome, Mecca & Jerusalem to unite against international terrorism", Vishal advocated the urgent need for the western world to look east and pay more serious attention to the sufferings of the people of India at the hands of cross-border terrorism.

Sharma was also Fellow at Session 415: Changing Concepts of Security in East Asia organised by the Salzburg Global Seminar and had extensive interactions with leading world leaders and influencers at the Schloss Leopoldskron and the Meierhoff. These included Prof. Lee Hong Koo, former Prime Minister of South Korea, Prof. Harding, former Advisor to President Bush, Ambassador Laney among others.

He was invited by the U.S. State Department in 2005 for the prestigious International Visitors Leadership Program IVLP. As part of this program, he interacted with local U.S. religious and political groups in Washington D.C., Jackson (Mississippi), Salt Lake City (Utah), Omaha-Lincoln (Nebraska), and Chicago (Illinois). Previous invitees to this program have been former Prime Minister Atal Bihari Vajpayee and former President Pratibha Patil.

Sharma was also invited as a summer faculty at a Swiss School near Geneva to address its students from over 60 nations. Sharma taught them during the summers of 2004, 2005 and 2006.

Education
Sharma has a Bachelor of Science in physics and a certificate in Executive Programme in Business Management from IIM Calcutta.
As part of his corporate governance training, the Dept. of Public Enterprises trained him in Companies Act, 2013 and the SEBI LODR (Listing Obligations and Disclosure Regulations), 2015 regulations to enhance his role on the board of Directors of BPCL, one of India's oil & gas giants with an annual turnover of over $50 billion. He served on its various board committees including the most important Audit Committee.

Career
Sharma was an officer on special duty in Gujarat when Modi was the chief minister there. He has served as a distinguished member of the governing body of SPIPA (Sardar Patel Institute of Public Administration) for 9 years. SPIPA is government of Gujarat's nodal body imparting good governance training to Gujarat state cadre officers both police and administrative. It also mentors aspirants to UPSC and other all India examinations. Sharma has been an independent director with BPCL. In fact, he was one of the youngest people ever to have served on the board of BPCL as a Director.

References

External links
 Vishal Sharma on Twitter

Living people
Indian diplomats
Year of birth missing (living people)